The Konnectid Project Vol.1 is a compilation album by the rapper Suga Free. It is mainly produced by DJ Quik and features appearances by Mausberg, DJ Quik, Xzibit, Kam, Playa Hamm, El DeBarge and others.

Track listing

2000 compilation albums
Suga Free albums
Albums produced by DJ Quik
West Coast hip hop compilation albums
G-funk compilation albums